Alec Poole is an Irish motor racing driver from Dublin. He competed successfully in saloon and sports car races in Great Britain throughout the 1960s. In 1969 he won the British Touring Car Championship in a privately entered Mini Cooper S. In 1968 he managed a fifteenth place in the 1968 24 Hours of Le Mans, driving for BMC in an Austin-Healey Sprite. He managed a third-place finish in the 1978 24 Hours of Daytona. During the 1990s he was manager of motorsport for Nissan Europe. He still competes in historic events such as the Goodwood Revival and the Silverstone Classic. As well as driving, he works as commercial director for the Tour Britannia historic racing event organisers.

Racing record

Complete British Saloon Car Championship results
(key) (Races in bold indicate pole position; races in italics indicate fastest lap.)

† Events with 2 races staged for the different classes.

References

External links
Tour Britannia Official Site

British Touring Car Championship drivers
British Touring Car Championship Champions
24 Hours of Le Mans drivers
Irish racing drivers
Living people
World Sportscar Championship drivers
12 Hours of Reims drivers
1943 births